John Ewart (1928–1994) was an Australian actor

John Ewart may also refer to:
John Ewart (architect) (1788–1856), Canadian architect and business
John Albert Ewart (1872–1964), Canadian architect
Jock Ewart (1891–1943), Scottish footballer
John Ewart (doctor) (1858–1939), New Zealand doctor and hospital superintendent
J. S. Ewart (John Skirving Ewart, 1849–1933), Canadian lawyer and author
Sir John Alexander Ewart (1821–1904), Scottish military leader